Clarence Eckerson, Jr. (born 1967) is a Queens-based videographer and the creator of BikeTV and Streetfilms.org.

Background 
Eckerson grew up in New York State and delivered newspapers by bicycle for five years. He developed an interest in film at an early age and made many silent home movies with a Super 8 camera, using his friends and family as actors. Upon graduation from University at Albany, Eckerson went on to work for several large media companies producing video and managing sales operations. He eventually started his own company, Trorb Productions.  He also became a bicycle advocate and served three years as head of Transportation Alternatives Brooklyn committee.

BikeTV 
In 2002, Eckerson created BikeTV, a cable show dedicated to showing all aspects of cycling in New York City and beyond.

Streetfilms 

In 2004, Eckerson started working for The Open Planning Project on the body of video work that would eventually become StreetFilms.org.  StreetFilms.org is a video blog that tackles the issues of the livable streets movement in conjunction with Streetsblog, also produced by the Open Planning Project. The site now documents New York transportation and explores transportation practices around the globe.  As of July 2010, Streetfilms shorts had been watched by more than 8,000,000 people.

References

External links
Streetfilms
BikeTV

American documentary filmmakers
1967 births
Living people
People from New York (state)
University at Albany, SUNY alumni